This article is a list of world champions in Ten-pin bowling in the tournaments listed below-
 World Championships of the International Bowling Federation IBF (formerly World Bowling), owns the World Championships and is under the International Olympic Committee. It is a sanctioning body for all international ten-pin bowling tournaments. Championships are held every 4 years and six male and six female from participating nations compete for medals for their flag. 
 The World Games, which include all sports that are not included in the Olympics.  Championships are held every 4 years, in the years following the Summer Olympic Games. Male and female participants compete for medals for their flag. 
 The Professional Bowlers Association world championships. PBA is the major sanctioning body for the sport of professional ten-pin bowling in the United States. The PBA World Championship is one of five major PBA bowling events.
 The QubicaAMF Bowling World Cup, previously known as the International Masters and AMF Bowling World Cup, is an annual championship sponsored by QubicaAMF Worldwide and played exclusively on AMF equipment. One male and/or one female bowler represents a nation in the tournament and a champion is declared.
 Other commercial or invitational world championship events.
 IBSA, the International Blind Sports Federation.
 World Deaf Bowling Championships

The World Championships
The World Championships is owned by International Bowling Federation (formerly known as World Bowling).
From 1963 to 2003, and from 2013 the world championships were conducted every fourth year. The two genders were divided beginning in 2005 in addition to the Combined World Championships. Participating countries sends 6 women and 6 men on each team for men and women. 

See World Tenpin Bowling Championships for the playing format.

Masters

All Events
The All-Events is the combined games from singles, doubles, trios and 5-player team.

Singles

Doubles, Trios and Team
The World Championships is owned by International Bowling Federation (formerly known as World Bowling). Doubles, Trios and Team events of the World Championships are listed below.

World Games
Sports not included in the Olympic games are a part of the World Games. Bowling is played since 1981, every fourth year.

Singles

All Events, Doubles, Mixed Doubles

Professional Bowling Association World Champions
The PBA World Championship is one of five major PBA (Professional Bowlers Association) bowling events. The PBA World Championship has been held in a variety of formats over the years. Since the 2009–10 season, the initial qualifying scores for the World Championship have come from other stand-alone tournaments at the PBA World Series of Bowling.  The current tournament is open to any PBA member who is also a competitor in the World Series of Bowling.

World U21 Championships
The World U21 Championships is owned by International Bowling Federation (formerly known as World Bowling). Athletes must be under the age of 21 on the first of January of the championship year. The World Singles Championships were held for the first time in 2022, and are held every second year in odd-numbered years. Each federation is allowed to send two male and two female athletes to the championships. Singles, Doubles, Team of Four (mixed genders), All Event, and Masters are the disciplines for both genders.

Singles

World Junior Championships
The World Junior Championships is owned by International Bowling Federation (formerly known as World Bowling). Athletes must be under the age of 18 on the first of January of the championship year. The World Singles Championships were held for the first time in 2019, and are held every second year in odd-numbered years. Each federation is allowed to send two male and two female athletes to the championships. Singles, Doubles, Team of Four (mixed genders), All Event, and Masters are the disciplines for both genders.

All Events

Singles

World Youth Championships

The World Youth Championships is owned by International Bowling Federation (formerly known as World Bowling). Athletes must be at least 13 years old and not older than 21 years old on January 1 of the championship year. The first World Youth Championships were held in Manila, the Philippines, in 1990. The championships were first held every other year in 1990, with two girls and two boys on each team. Since 1994, each team has consisted of four girls and four boys. Since 1994 the disciplines for both genders have been Singles, Doubles, Team of Four, All
Event and Masters.

Masters

All Events

Singles

Doubles and Team
The World Championships is owned by International Bowling Federation (formerly known as World Bowling). Doubles, and Team events of the World Youth Championships are listed here.

QubicaAMF Bowling World Cup
The QubicaAMF Bowling World Cup, previously known as the International Masters and AMF Bowling World Cup, is an annual championship sponsored by QubicaAMF Worldwide. Each nation chooses one male and/or one female bowler to represent them in the tournament.

Discontinued World Championships

World Singles Championships
The championships was conducted twice by World Bowling who owns the World Championships. Initially designed every fourth year, participants are two men and two women from participating nations. The first edition was held in Limassol, Cyprus in 2012, with 71 male and 57 female athletes from 40 different federations competing. The last was in Doha, Qatar with 81 male and 53 female athletes.

World Tenpin Masters
The World Tenpin Masters was an invitational ten-pin bowling tournament hosted by Matchroom Sport Television that ran from 1998 to 2009. Sixteen (16) bowlers are invited to compete head-to-head in a single lane in a straight knockout format.

IBSA Men's Champions

The following is a list of IBSA World Champions for visually impaired bowlers, sanctioned by the World Tenpin Bowling Association and International Blind Sports Association.

References

External links
 Professional Bowling Association
 International Bowling Federation
 WTBA Home
 IBSA Home

Ten-pin bowling
Bowling Champions
World